Barry Hill is an ice-free hill just west of the mouth of LaPrade Valley and about 1 nautical mile (1.9 km) north-northeast of Mount Kenyon, in the Cumulus Hills. Named by Advisory Committee on Antarctic Names (US-ACAN) for Lieutenant Richard P. Barry, CEC, U.S. Navy, communications officer at McMurdo Station, winter 1957, who participated in U.S. Navy Operation Deepfreeze I, II and III, 1955–58.

References

Geography of Antarctica